Daltrey is a surname. Notable people with the surname include:

Peter Daltrey (born 1946), English musician
Roger Daltrey (born 1944), English singer, musician, actor, and film producer